Dacheng County is a county in the central part of Hebei province, China, bordering Tianjin to the northeast. It is the southernmost county-level division of the prefecture-level city of Langfang.

Administrative divisions

Towns:
Pingshu, Wangcun, Dashangtun, Nanzhaofu, Liugezhuang, Quancun, Litan

Townships:
Beiwei Township, Daguang'an Township, Zangtun Township

Climate

References

External links
 www.dacheng.gov.cn (official site of the county government)

 
County-level divisions of Hebei
Langfang